Siwan is an album by pianist Jon Balke recorded in 2007/08 and released on the ECM label in 2009.

Reception
The Allmusic review by Thom Jurek awarded the album 4½ stars stating "Every track here reveals something unusual, brings something hidden and alien to the fore even as it beguiles the listener with its intimacy of secret histories and knowledge. Siwan is Balke's masterpiece thus far, and will hopefully become as influential as it is groundbreaking".

Track listing
All compositions by Jon Balke with lyrics by Amina Alaoui
 "Tuchia" - 4:56 
 "O Andalusin" - 2:25 
 "Jadwa" - 5:17 
 "Ya Safwati" - 5:17 
 "Ondas Do Mar de Vigo" - 4:30 
 "Itimad" - 6:43 
 "A La Dina Dana" - 3:27 
 "Zahori" - 4:56 
 "Ashiyin Raïqin" - 4:16 
 "Thulâthiyat" - 10:04 
 "Toda Ciencia Trascendiendo" - 12:23 
Recorded at Rainbow Studio in Oslo, Norway in 2007/08.

Personnel
 Jon Balke — keyboards, conductor
 Amina Alaoui — vocal
 Jon Hassell — trumpet, electronics
 Kheir-Eddine M'Kachiche — violin
 Helge Andreas Norbakken — percussion
 Pedram Khavar Zamini — zarb
Barokksolistene: 
 Bjarte Eike — violin, leader
 Per Buhre, Peter Spissky, Anna Ivanovna Sundin, Milos Valent — violin
 Rastko Roknic, Joel Sundin — viola
 Tom Pitt — cello
 Kate Hearne — cello, recorder
 Mattias Frostensson — double bass
 Andreas Arend — theorboe, archlute
 Hans Knut Sveen — harpsichord, clavichord

References

ECM Records albums
2009 albums
Albums produced by Manfred Eicher